Hotaru may refer to:

Places 
 Hotaru, in Grojdibodu Commune, Olt County, Romania
 Hotaru, in Andreiașu de Jos Commune, Vrancea County, Romania

People 
 Hotaru Akane (1983–2016), Japanese actress
 Hotaru Hazuki (born 1970), Japanese actress and gravure model
 Hotaru Okamoto, manga artist of Only Yesterday
 Hotaru Yamaguchi (born 1990), football player
 Hotaru Yukijiro, actor, starred in Sexy Battle Girls, GARO

Characters 
 Hotaru Shidare (枝垂 ほたる, Shidare Hotaru), a character in the manga series Dagashi Kashi
 Hotaru (.hack), a wavemaster character in the .hack//Legend of the Twilight Bracelet anime
 Hotaru (Mortal Kombat), a male character in the Mortal Kombat fighting games
 Hotaru, a character in the manga series Shugo Chara!
 Hotaru, a character in the manga series Samurai Deeper Kyo
 Hotaru Futaba, a character in SNK Playmore fighting games
 Hotaru Himegi, a character in the visual novel If My Heart Had Wings
, a character in the manga series New Game!
 Hotaru Ichijo, a character in the manga series Non Non Biyori
 Hotaru Imai, a character in the anime series Alice Academy
, a character in the manga series Aoharu x Machinegun
 Hotaru Tomoe, lookalike reincarnation of Sailor Saturn herself, is a supporting character in the manga of Sailor Moon and third season of the 1992-1997 anime. She becomes a supporting character in Sailor Moon Crystal and the 2020 two-part movie Sailor Moon Eternal, based on the 11-episode Dream saga

Other
 Hotaru CMS, a GNU GPL licensed, plugin-powered content management system

See also 
 Hotaru River (disambiguation)
 Hotaru no Haka, or Grave of the Fireflies, a 1988 Studio Ghibli anime film
 Hotar

Japanese unisex given names